Henry Albert Brauer (1854–1918) was a member of the Wisconsin State Assembly.

Biography
Brauer was born on April 28, 1854 in Bitterfeld, then in the Kingdom of Prussia, to Gottlieb Brauer and Amelia Kramer. Later that year, he moved with his parents to Oshkosh, Wisconsin. In 1871, Brauer moved to Shawano, Wisconsin. He was a barber by trade.  Brauer died March 9, 1918, in Chicago, Illinois.

Political career
Brauer was elected to the Assembly in 1892. Other positions he held include Sheriff of Shawano County, Wisconsin. He was a Democrat.

References

1854 births
1918 deaths
Democratic Party members of the Wisconsin State Assembly
People from Bitterfeld-Wolfen
People from Shawano, Wisconsin
Politicians from Oshkosh, Wisconsin
Prussian emigrants to the United States
Wisconsin sheriffs